The Hyatt Regency Denver at the Colorado Convention Center is a 489 ft (149 m) tall skyscraper in Denver, Colorado. It was constructed from 2003 to 2005 and has 38 floors. It is the 8th tallest building in Denver. It is currently owned by Plant Holdings NA, Inc. and leased to Hyatt Corporation.

See also
List of tallest buildings in Denver

References
Hyatt Regency Denver Official Website
Emporis
Skyscraperpage

Hotel buildings completed in 2005
Hyatt Hotels and Resorts
Skyscraper hotels in Denver